Dávid Guba (born 29 June 1991) is a Slovak football player who plays as winger for MŠK Považská Bystrica.

Club career
Born in Humenné, Guba played as a youth for TJ Sokol Vydraň, MŠK Spartak Medzilaborce and 1. HFC Humenné, where he played until he joined 1. FC Tatran Prešov in 2005. Guba was promoted to the first team during the 2008–09 season. His debut came on November 7, 2009 in the Corgoň Liga match against FK Dukla Banská Bystrica, entering in as a substitute in place of Michal Piter-Bučko. On November 19, 2011 he scored his first goal for 1. FC Tatran Prešov, against MFK Ružomberok in a 1–1 draw. In winter 2013, he came to MŠK Žilina and he signed a half-year loan with option to buy from 1. FC Tatran Prešov.

International career
Guba was first called up to the senior national team for two unofficial friendly fixtures held in Abu Dhabi, UAE, in January 2017, against Uganda and Sweden. He capped his debut against Uganda, being fielded in the 70th minute, after substituting Tomáš Malec. Slovakia went on to lose the game 1–3. Guba also played the first 60 minutes of the match against Sweden, before being substituted by Filip Oršula. Slovakia lost the game 0–6.

External links
1. FC Tatran Prešov profile

References

1991 births
Living people
Sportspeople from Humenné
Slovak footballers
Slovak expatriate footballers
Slovakia youth international footballers
Slovakia under-21 international footballers
Association football forwards
1. FC Tatran Prešov players
MŠK Žilina players
AS Trenčín players
Bruk-Bet Termalica Nieciecza players
MFK Karviná players
FK Senica players
FC Košice (2018) players
MŠK Považská Bystrica (football) players
Slovak Super Liga players
Ekstraklasa players
Czech First League players
2. Liga (Slovakia) players
Expatriate footballers in Poland
Slovak expatriate sportspeople in Poland
Expatriate footballers in the Czech Republic
Slovak expatriate sportspeople in the Czech Republic